Alexandra Ros is a German analytical chemist who is a professor in both the School of Molecular Sciences and Center for Applied Structural Discovery at The Biodesign Institute, Arizona State University. Her research considers microfluidic platforms and their use in analysis. She was awarded the 2020 Advancing Electrokinetic Science Electrophoresis Society Mid-Career Achievement Award.

Early life and education 
Ros was an undergraduate student at the Ruprecht-Karls University (now Heidelberg University) in Heidelberg. She majored in chemistry, and moved to the École Polytechnique Fédérale de Lausanne (EPFL) for doctoral research. Her doctoral research considered protein separation and analysis.  After earning her doctorate, Ros moved to Bielefeld University, where she started to explore microfluidics. She completed her habilitation in 2007, and was awarded a Venia Legendi in experimental physics.

Research and career 
In 2008, Ros moved to the United States, where she was appointed to the faculty of Arizona State University. She was awarded a National Science Foundation CAREER Award. She was promoted to Associate Professor in 2014 and Professor in 2020. She spent 2015 as a Alexander von Humboldt Foundation Fellow at the University of Göttingen.

In 2018, Ros was awarded a Federation of Analytical Chemistry and Spectroscopy Societies (FACSS) innovation prize. The award allowed her to explore serial femtosecond crystallography using X-ray free-electron laser (XFELs). Serial femtosecond crystallography, SFX, can unravel the complicated structures of proteins with femto-second time resolution. Ultra-short, high intensity X-ray pulses can determine high-resolution protein structures before causing damage to the sample, so-called “diffraction before destruction”. The X-ray exposure can destroy the crystals being examined, such that thousands of diffraction patterns from multiple crystals must be acquired to obtain a full data set. Ros pioneered the development of microfluidic devices for SFX-XFEL sample delivery.

Ros was awarded the 2020 FACSS Advancing Electrokinetic Science (AES) Electrophoresis Society Mid-Career Achievement Award for her work in electrophoresis and microfluidics.

Selected publications

References 

Living people
Year of birth missing (living people)
German biochemists
École Polytechnique Fédérale de Lausanne alumni
Arizona State University faculty
German academics
Heidelberg University alumni